Borromeo is a surname. Notable people with the surname include:

 House of Borromeo, an aristocratic family in Milan

Members of the House of Borromeo
 Andrea Borromeo (c. 1615 – 1683), Theatine priest
 Charles Borromeo (1538 – 1584), cardinal of the Roman Catholic Church
 Federico Borromeo (1564 – 1631), archbishop of Milan, cousin of Charles
 Celia Grillo Borromeo (1684 – 1777),  Italian (Genovese) mathematician and scientist
 Beatrice Borromeo (born 1985), Italian journalist
 Matilde Borromeo (born 1983), Italian equestrian
 Agostino Borromeo (born 1944), Italian professor and historian, General Governor of the Order of the Holy Sepulchre

Other people
 Alexander Borromeo (born 1983), Filipino football player
 Charles Borromeo (athlete) (born 1958), Indian track and field athlete
 Leah Borromeo, British journalist and filmmaker
 Luis Borromeo or Borromeo Lou, Filipino jazz pianist and vaudeville performer

See also
 Peschiera Borromeo, a municipality in Milan, Italy
 Borromean clinic, a model of psychoanalytic practice
 Collegio Borromeo, a university hall of residence in Pavia, Italy
 Borromean rings, an arrangement of topological circles
 Molecular Borromean rings, an interlocked molecular architecture
 Sisters of Mercy of St. Borromeo, a group of Catholic religious congregations
 Society of St. Charles Borromeo, a German Catholic literary association
 Charles Borromeo Church (disambiguation)